The 2016 Tour of Britain was a nine-stage men's professional road cycling race. It was the thirteenth running of the modern version of the Tour of Britain and the 76th British tour in total. The race started on 4 September in Glasgow and finished on 11 September in London. The race was part of the 2016 UCI Europe Tour.

 rider Steve Cummings became the first British rider to win the Tour overall since Bradley Wiggins in 2013, as well as improving upon two previous runner-up finishes to win the race for the first time. Cummings finished second on the second stage in Cumbria, and assumed the race lead from Belgium's Julien Vermote at the summit finish at Haytor, and maintained the yellow jersey over the final two days.

In the race's other classifications, another Dutch rider Dylan Groenewegen won the blue jersey for the points classification on the final stage, taking the lead from Dennis with a second-place finish to Caleb Ewan in London. Groenewegen also won a stage during the race, the longest stage of the Tour, into Builth Wells. Xandro Meurisse from Belgium, riding for the  team as a stagiaire, won the black jersey for the mountains classification, as well as finishing seventh overall in the general classification. With two riders in the top ten overall – Nicolas Roche sixth and Ben Swift eighth –  won the teams classification, while Germany's André Greipel, who won the opening stage into Castle Douglas, was named as the Tour's most combative rider.

For the first time since 2006, no rider won more than one stage. As well as the victories recorded by Greipel, Vermote, Groenewegen, Dennis and Ewan;  pair Ian Stannard and Wout Poels, 's Jack Bauer and  rider Tony Martin took stage wins.

Teams
The twenty-one teams invited to participate in the Tour of Britain are:

Schedule
The route for the race was announced in February 2016.

Stages

Stage 1
4 September 2016 — Glasgow to Castle Douglas,

Stage 2
5 September 2016 — Carlisle to Kendal,

Stage 3
6 September 2016 — Congleton to Tatton Park,

Stage 4
7 September 2016 — Denbigh to Builth Wells,

Stage 5
8 September 2016 — Aberdare to Bath,

Stage 6
9 September 2016 — Sidmouth to Haytor,

Stage 7a
10 September 2016 — Bristol, individual time trial (ITT)

Stage 7b
10 September 2016 — Bristol,

Stage 8
11 September 2016 — London,

Classification leadership

Final standings

General classification

Points classification

Mountains classification

Sprints classification

Best British classification

Team classification

References

External links

2016
Tour of Britain
Tour of Britain
Tour of Britain